Mylene Ong Chui Bin (Ong Chui Bin, born 23 July 1991) is a Singaporean swimmer. At the 2012 Summer Olympics, she competed in the Women's 100-metre freestyle, finishing in 29th place overall in the heats, failing to qualify for the semifinals.

Ong won medals at the 2007, 2009, and 2011 Southeast Asian Games. She also competed at the 2006 and 2010 Asian Games, and the 2006 Commonwealth Games.

References

External links
 
 
 
 

1991 births
Living people
Singaporean female butterfly swimmers
Singaporean female freestyle swimmers
Asian Games competitors for Singapore
Swimmers at the 2006 Asian Games
Swimmers at the 2010 Asian Games
Commonwealth Games competitors for Singapore
Swimmers at the 2006 Commonwealth Games
Olympic swimmers of Singapore
Swimmers at the 2012 Summer Olympics
Southeast Asian Games medalists in swimming
Southeast Asian Games gold medalists for Singapore
Southeast Asian Games silver medalists for Singapore
Southeast Asian Games bronze medalists for Singapore
Competitors at the 2007 Southeast Asian Games
Competitors at the 2009 Southeast Asian Games
Competitors at the 2011 Southeast Asian Games
Singaporean people of Chinese descent
21st-century Singaporean women